Covenant Christian School is a private Christian school located in Palm Bay, Florida. The school educates students in Kindergarten to 12th grade. The school was founded as a ministry of Covenant Presbyterian Church of Palm Bay in 1993.  It is no longer associated with the church. The school announced that it would merge with Calvary Chapel Academy on their campus beginning in the Fall of 2021, making the 2020–2021 school year the final one for the school. The final school day and chapel was on May 21st with the final graduation on May 28th.

References

External links 
 Covenant Christian School website

Christian schools in Florida
Educational institutions established in 1993
High schools in Brevard County, Florida
Private high schools in Florida
Private middle schools in Florida
Private elementary schools in Florida
1993 establishments in Florida